West Gippsland, a region of Gippsland in Victoria, Australia, extends from the southeastern limits of metropolitan Melbourne and Western Port Bay in the west to the Latrobe Valley in the east, and is bounded by the Strzelecki Ranges to the south and the Mount Baw Baw Plateau in the Great Dividing Range to the north.

Geography
The western part of the region around Western Port Bay and the Bunyip River is mostly flat (much of it having been reclaimed from the drained Koo Wee Rup Swamp), while the eastern part consists of low rolling hills.

To the north these hills become steeper as they merge into the Great Dividing Range. In the mountainous north around Noojee logging remains an important industry, while a small winter resort is located to the northeast at Mount Baw Baw. Further to the east are the small township of Erica and the historic gold mining town of Walhalla.

Nature reserves in the region include Bunyip State Park, Mount Worth State Park and Baw Baw National Park. Principal towns of West Gippsland include (from west to east along the Princes Highway) Drouin, Warragul and Trafalgar.

Regions of Victoria (Australia)
Gippsland (region)